The 2022 Bredene Koksijde Classic was the 19th edition of the Bredene Koksijde Classic road cycling one day race, which was held on 18 March 2022, starting and finishing in the titular towns of Bredene and Koksijde, respectively.

Teams 
Nine UCI WorldTeams, nine UCI ProTeams, and two UCI Continental teams made up the twenty teams that participated in the race.

UCI WorldTeams

 
 
 
 
 
 
 
 
 

UCI ProTeams

 
 
 
 
 
 
 
 
 

UCI Continental Teams

Result

References

External links 
 

2022
Bredene Koksijde Classic
Bredene Koksijde Classic
Bredene Koksijde Classic